The pale chub, (Zacco platypus), also known as pale bleak or fresh-water sprat, is a species of fish native to rivers and streams from northern China and Korea to northern Vietnam. Its diet consists of zooplankton, invertebrates, fish, and debris.
Zacco platypus Is called Oikawa オイカワ（追河、Opsariichthys platypus）in Japan.

Description 
The pale chub has a moderately large head with moderately large eyes that are located on the upper side of the head. They have a large mouth, so much so that the posterior end of the jaw reaches the anterior part of the eye. The pale chub has an elongated body that is more compressed at the posterior end. Their maximum length is 20 cm and on average pale chubs are 13 cm in length. The cycloid scales are moderately large, and they have a complete lateral line. There are no scales on the head. They have a forked caudal fin. They have a grayish coloration close to the dorsal with the rest of the body being silvery. When spawning, the males will have 10 or more vertical strips that are bluish in color. They can live for 6 or more years.

Habitat 
They live primarily in freshwater. The adults prefer streams and rivers that have a rapid flow. They do not really like deep, stagnant water. They mainly live by the bottom when adults because that is where their food source is located.

Distribution 
They are widely distributed to northern China, Korea and northern Vietnam. They are also found in Japan and the northwestern part of Taiwan. They are mostly found in climates of 10°- 22 °C.

Diet 
They are omnivores but prefer eating other animals over eating plants. They feed on zooplankton, algae, small fish and detritus. When young, they mainly eat insects and larvae. The young tend to hunt in groups, and they tend to hunt at dawn. Adults tend to be more solitary in their hunting.

Reproduction 
In nature, males become vibrant around the time of breeding to attract females to mate. Pale chubs are typically free-range. That means that they leave egg and sperm free instead of brood care. There have been no reports of successful breeding in an aquarium although it is possible for reproduction in an aquarium.

Uses 

Zacco platypus are used as bait for sport-fishing for larger fish. They are popular for fly fishers and are caught for consumption. Males are used for aquariums because of their vibrant coloring.

References

Cyprinid fish of Asia
Taxa named by Coenraad Jacob Temminck
Taxa named by Hermann Schlegel
Fish described in 1846